Liberty State Park (LSP) is a park in the U.S. state of New Jersey, located on Upper New York Bay in Jersey City opposite Liberty Island and Ellis Island. The park opened in 1976 to coincide with bicentennial celebrations and is operated and maintained by the New Jersey Division of Parks and Forestry. The main part of the park is bordered by water on three sides: on the north by the Morris Canal Big Basin and on the south and east by Upper New York Bay. The New Jersey Turnpike Newark Bay Extension (I-78) marks its western perimeter.

Geography

Communipaw Cove is part of the  state nature preserve in the park and is one of the few remaining tidal salt marshes along the Hudson River estuary.
The Interpretive Center, designed by architect Michael Graves, is part of the preserve. To the west lies the Interior Natural Area, which is off limits to the public and is being allowed through natural processes to recover from environmental abuse.

240 acres of the center of the park has been fenced off and contaminated with hazardous materials  such as chromium, arsenic, petroleum.  The 6 acre train shed  is also fenced off and contaminated with asbestos.

History

Much of the park is situated on landfilled tidal flats. In the latter half of 19th century, a small island named Black Tom was joined via landfill with the mainland. It became a major shipping, manufacturing, and transportation hub within Port of New York and New Jersey, leading to the construction of Communipaw Terminal. It was from this ferry/train station that many immigrants arriving at Ellis Island spread out across the US. In 1916, on what is now the southeastern corner of the park, the Black Tom explosion killed as many as seven people, caused $20 million in property damage, and was felt throughout the Tri-State Region.

The park was conceived in the 1960s. with the land  transferred from the city to the state in 1965.Audrey Zapp, Theodore Conrad, Morris Pesin and J. Owen Grundy were influential environmentalists and historians who spearheaded the movement that led to the creation of Liberty State Park. They are remembered by the naming of places and streets along the waterfront.

It is estimated the park suffered $20 million in damages during Superstorm Sandy in October 2012. In June 2016, the Central Railroad of New Jersey Terminal reopened after a $20 million renovation to repair the extensive damage caused by Sandy. The Nature Interpretive Center reopened in June 2021.

On January 11, 2018, it was announced by New Jersey Department of Environmental Protection (NJDEP) that the interior  of the park that have been closed off to the public for decades due to hazardous material and severely contaminated land would be remediated for the entire community to safely enjoy. The restoration is to be done in phases with the initial phase focusing on a  parcel of the interior.  There is currently no timeline yet for the remediation but the funding is to come from natural resource damage settlements. Work would begin in 2021 but unfortunately that has never happened and the land sits fenced off and contaminated to this day.

Points of interest

Freedom Way and Liberty Walkway
Liberty Walkway, a crescent-shaped promenade, stretches from the CRRNJ Terminal along the waterfront south to the Statue of Liberty overlook, bridging two coves along the way. It is part of the longer Hudson River Waterfront Walkway. Halfway along Liberty Walkway is a bridge to Ellis Island, but only authorized vehicles are allowed.
The southeastern corner of the park contains the Statue of Liberty overlook, picnic facilities, a playground, the U.S. Flag Plaza and Liberation Monument, the Public Administration Building, and a memorial to the Black Tom explosions. Picnicking and barbecuing facilities are also located at the southern end of the park. Originally called "Liberty Walk", this part of the project won a landscape award in 1995.

Liberty Science Center
Liberty Science Center, which lies in the western portion of the park, is an interactive science museum and learning center. The center opened in 1993 as New Jersey's first major state science museum. It has science exhibits, the world's 5th largest IMAX Dome theater, the largest planetarium in the Western Hemisphere, numerous educational resources, and the original Hoberman sphere, a silver, computer-driven engineering artwork designed by Chuck Hoberman.

Monuments and memorials

Liberation is a 1985 bronze sculpture designed by Nathan Rapoport as a memorial to the Holocaust, showing a U.S. soldier carrying out a survivor from a Nazi death camp.

La Vela di Colombo is a two-story sail-shaped bronze monument designed by Gino Gianetti that commemorates the 500th anniversary of the westward journey of Christopher Columbus to America in 1492. The "Sail of Columbus" sits atop a stone base in the shape of a ship and features scenes of Columbus and his travels. The gift from Government of Italy and the City of Genoa was dedicated in 1998.

Empty Sky is the official state memorial to the September 11 attacks of the World Trade Center. Situated on a berm the parallel walls engraved with the names of victims are oriented to face the former World Trade Center site. Designed by architect Frederic Schwartz, it was dedicated on September 10, 2011, commemorating the tenth anniversary of the attacks.

A temporary monument designed by Zaq Landsberg called Reclining Liberty will be on display adjacent to Empty Sky until April 2023. The monument, which shows the Statue of Liberty lying on her side, was previously on display in Harlem's Marcus Garvey Park where it received attention from Time Out and Gothamist. It was inspired by reclining Buddha statues in Asia as its intended meaning is to reconsider the meaning of the United States which, like the Statue of Liberty, is as Landsberg describes "an entity forever upright and tall".

Liberty State Park Conservation, Recreation, and Community Inclusion Act

The administration of Governor Chris Christie proposed various commercial activities for the park. In 2017, it suggested leasing large parts of the waterfront for private marinas.

Caven Point is a 22 acre man-made piece of land and sits adjacent to the Liberty National Golf Course. It is the only sandy beach along the shoreline and home to various migratory birds. Proposals to protect the land have been made in the New Jersey Legislature such as the Liberty State Park Protection Act to specifically protect the park from all development without a severe vetting process and public scrutiny.
That proposal has been rejected by both the senate and the assembly for its exclusion of the surrounding community. The Liberty State Park Conservation, Recreation, and Community Inclusion Act was passed in July 2022 with and as a result the community which had been intentionally left out of the conversation for decades would now be a part of the decision making within this park. “ The Liberty State Park Conservation, Recreation, and Community Inclusion Act establishes a 17-member Liberty State Park Design Task Force within the New Jersey Department of Environmental Protection (NJDEP) to assist with developing short-term plans to improve public use at the park.

“For far too long, Liberty State Park has been neglected, and it is time we finally put in the work needed to establish it as the crown jewel of New Jersey’s park system,” said State Sen. Brian Stack (D-32), who served as a sponsor of the bill in the Senate.”

Task Force 

Additionally, the Task Force would develop a long-term master plan to improve park facilities and amenities, create new transportation and mobility services, and further preserve the park’s natural resources.”

Transportation
The Hudson-Bergen Light Rail runs just west of the park with a station at its entrance.

In July 2012, North Jersey Transportation Planning Authority allotted $175,000 to study transportation alternatives to and within the park.

In March 2013, Jersey City received a $500,000 grant to study the extension of Jersey Avenue directly into the park, to simplify access from the Downtown neighborhoods, facilitate through traffic to and from Communipaw, and provide alternatives for turnpike users to access the downtown. In May 2013, a new pedestrian-bike bridge was placed over Mill Creek at the small basin to replace an older one that had been destroyed by Superstorm Sandy in October 2012. It is situated so as not interfere with any new road construction.

In 2014 NJDOT announced that it would build a $10 million bridge over the Morris Canal Basin, reducing the commute between the park and Downtown Jersey City by more than half a mile. Construction of the connection between Jersey Ave and Phillip Street began in August 2019; the two-lane road with adjoining bike lanes was opened to traffic in August 2021. Since the opening, residents have complained about safety concerns and an increase in traffic congestion due to Holland Tunnel-bound traffic connecting to I-78 through the park. Prior to the bridge, the Mayor Steven Fulop announced the city administration is experimenting with traffic light timing and collaborating with navigation service Waze to reduce congestion.

In popular culture

On Labor Day in 1980, Republican Nominee for President Ronald Reagan kicked off his national campaign on Liberty Island, with the Statue of Liberty behind him and said: 'I want more than anything I've ever wanted, to have an administration that will, through its actions, at home and in the international arena, let millions of people know that Miss Liberty still "Lifts her lamp beside the golden door."'

In 2002, Budweiser filmed two commercials to dedicate the September 11 attacks in the park (one in 2002, and another one in 2011). Both were only aired once.

Festivals and performances
 In 2000, Andrea Bocelli gave a concert at the park, broadcast on PBS, as American Dream: Andrea Bocelli's Statue Of Liberty Concert.
 In 2001, Cirque du Soleil premiered its new work.
 In 2013, Cher, Tim McGraw, Miguel, Mariah Carey and Selena Gomez performed at the park for the Macy's Fourth of July Fireworks Spectacular.
 The Super Bowl LI Kickoff spectacular was held by the Communipaw Terminal in 2014, and featured performances from Goo Goo Dolls, and Daughtry. Erin Andrews, Jordin Sparks, and Joe Buck hosted the event.
 Jersey City's Freedom and Fireworks Festival debuted in the park in 2017 Independence Day and included performances from Fireworks by Grucci and the Jersey City-based Kool & the Gang. The festival has since been held in the city's Exchange Place neighborhood.
Alicia Keys and Swae Lee performed at the park for the 2021 MTV Video Music Awards

Film and television
 In 1968, the film Funny Girl shot the "Don't Rain on My Parade" sequence in the Central Railroad of NJ Terminal.
 In 1971, the famous The Godfather (1972) scene containing Peter Clemenza and Rocco Lampone's famous exchange, "Leave the gun. Take the cannoli", was filmed at the site before the construction of Liberty State Park.
 In 1997, the film Men in Black depicts a scene where Agent J delivers a newborn alien squid on Morris Pesin Drive.
 The 30 Rock episode The Aftermath was filmed in Liberty Harbor.
 The final scenes of the 2014 adaptation of Annie were shot at Liberty State Park.
In the 2018 Netflix series Seven Seconds, the bicycle accident at the center of the plot of season 1 occurs at Liberty State Park.

Sports
Since 2007, the Veuve Clicquot Polo Classic is held every Spring at Liberty State Park.

In May 2010, plans were put forth outlining the use of the park as the new home of the United States Formula One Grand Prix for the 2012 season. These plans met outrage from the community, particularly the Friends of Liberty State Park, and were ultimately rejected by the New Jersey Department of Environmental Protection.

On June 19 and 20, 2010, the park hosted the fifth round of the 2010 Red Bull Air Race World Championship.

Image gallery

See also

 List of New Jersey state parks
 Hudson River Waterfront Walkway
 Hudson Parks
 Port of New York and New Jersey
 Marine life of New York-New Jersey Harbor Estuary

References

External links

 
 Central Railroad of New Jersey Terminal
 Friends of Liberty State Park, an advocacy group for the park's preservation
 The New York Times, 1913 proposal to develop Jersey City port facilities
 

State parks of New Jersey
Parks in Hudson County, New Jersey
Urban public parks
Neighborhoods in Hudson County, New Jersey
Parks on the Hudson River
Redeveloped ports and waterfronts in the United States
Nature centers in New Jersey
Tourist attractions in Jersey City, New Jersey
Geography of Jersey City, New Jersey
1976 establishments in New Jersey